The 2007 Pennsylvania 500, the twenty-first race of the 2007 NASCAR Nextel Cup season was held on Sunday, August 5, 2007 at Pocono Raceway in Long Pond, Pennsylvania.

Background

Qualifying
Dale Earnhardt Jr. won the pole position after being allowed to requalify when a rainstorm interrupted his attempt which resulted in a 45-minute rain delay. NASCAR allowed Earnhardt to put on new tires and cool down his car because of the delay, when temperatures cooled down.

Kevin Lepage (#37), Mike Bliss (#49), Kenny Wallace (#78) and A. J. Allmendinger (#84) all failed to make the race.

Race
Outside polesitter Kurt Busch would be the class of the field, dominating for 175 of 200 laps and taking his first victory since the Food City 500 at Bristol Motor Speedway in March 2006. While Busch dominated, the main story of the day was that of the polesitter. Dale Jr.'s team had brought an overly aggressive shock package to Pocono, and it was not working for them as the car was tight despite numerous adjustments. Their struggles hit a low point when Earnhardt Jr. spun the car in turn three. The team changed the shock and Dale Jr. rallied back to second place. Despite this comeback, Busch had overtaken Earnhardt Jr. for the critical 12th position in points.

Jeff Gordon extended his points lead over Denny Hamlin to 366 points.

Race results

Notes
 Kurt Busch has led a track record 175 laps.
 Kurt's track record for most laps led can't be broken because in 2012 Pocono revised the distances of their races down from 500 to 400 miles. Making the distances of the events only 160 laps. In 2020, when Pocono started the doubleheader weekend, the Saturday Cup event was revised down to 325 miles/130 laps, and the Sunday Cup event was revised down to 350 miles/140 laps.

References

External links

Complete race results 
Points standings 

Pennsylvania 500
Pennsylvania 500
NASCAR races at Pocono Raceway
August 2007 sports events in the United States